Lois Lake is a  lake located on Vancouver Island, Canada, north of Great Central Lake, south of Elsie Lake.

References

Alberni Valley
Lakes of Vancouver Island
Lakes of British Columbia
Newcastle Land District